Gregory Fraser is an American poet.

Biography
Gregory Fraser is an American poet, editor, and professor. He is the author of three poetry collections, Strange Pietà, Answering the Ruins, and Designed for Flight, as well as the co-author, with poet Chad Davidson, of two college textbooks, Writing Poetry and Analyze Anything. Fraser grew up in Philadelphia and its suburbs, and earned a B.A. at Ursinus College, an M.F.A. at Columbia University, and a Ph.D. at the University of Houston. His poetry has appeared in such journals as The New Yorker, The Paris Review, The Southern Review, The Gettysburg Review, and Ploughshares. The recipient of grants from the Guggenheim Foundation and the National Endowment for the Arts, Fraser teaches at the University of West Georgia, located an hour west of Atlanta, and serves as features editor of the Birmingham Poetry Review. (Curriculum Vitae )

Awards

 2017 Meringoff Prize in Poetry (Association of Literary Scholars, Critics, and Writers)
 2016 James Dickey Poetry Prize (Five Points literary magazine)
 2015 John Simon Guggenheim Memorial Foundation Fellowship
 2010 Georgia Author of the Year in Poetry
 2009 Sewanee Writers’ Conference Fellowship
 2005 National Endowment for the Arts Fellowship
 Texas Teachers of Creative Writing Award
 Walt McDonald First Book Award 
 Associated Writing Programs Award
 Houston Arts Council Literary Award

Bibliography

Poetry 
Collections
 
 Answering the Ruins 
 Strange Pietà 

List of poems

Non-fiction 

 Analyze Anything: A Guide to Critical Reading and Writing, textbook (with Chad Davidson) 
 Writing Poetry: Creative-Critical Approaches, textbook (with Chad Davidson)

Online Works and Reviews
 Review of Designed for Flight by Shawn Delgado 
 Review of Designed for Flight by Lauren Watel 
 “Her Mistake,” Verse Daily/Southeast Review 
 “At the Degas Exhibit,” Poetry Daily/Five Points 
 “The Great Northeast,” The Missouri Review 
 “End of Days,” Verse Daily/The Southern Review 
 “Ficus,” Verse Daily/Birmingham Poetry Review 
 “Epithalamium,” Verse Daily/New South 
 Review of Answering the Ruins 
 A Different Bother (chapbook), Beard of Bees Press 
 Interview with Gregory Fraser 
 Review of Strange Pietà 
 Interview with Gregory Fraser 

Living people
American male poets
The New Yorker people
University of West Georgia faculty
Year of birth missing (living people)